Dehradun Cantonment is a cantonment town in Dehradun district  in the state of Uttarakhand, India. It was established in 1913.

Demographics
 India census, Dehradun Cantonment had a population of 30,102. Males constitute 52% of the population and females 48%. Dehradun Cantonment has an average literacy rate of 79%, higher than the national average of 59.5%: male literacy is 82% and, female literacy is 76%. In Dehradun Cantonment, 10% of the population is under 6 years of age.

Locations
Tapkeshwar Mandir, Forest Research Institute (FRI), Robbers Cave (Guchhupani), Indian Military Academy (IMA), Oil and Natural Gas Corporation Limited (ONGC). Mandir, Rashtriya Indian Military College (RIMC), Raj Bhavan, CM's Residence.

Schools and institutes
 Forest Research Institute

 Indian Military Academy

 Rashtriya Indian Military College

 The Doon School

See also
 Dehradun Cantonment (Uttarakhand Assembly constituency)
Clement Town

References

Cities and towns in Dehradun district
History of Dehradun
D
D